Solidarity Electoral Action (AWS) was a political coalition in Poland from 1996 to 2001. From 1997 to 2001, its official name was Akcja Wyborcza Solidarność Prawicy (AWSP) or Electoral Action Solidarity of the Right.

 AWS (RS AWS), or the Social Movement for Electoral Action Solidarity, the political arm of the  Solidarity trade union from 1997 to 2004, was formerly the leading party within AWS.

Background
AWS was formed in 1996 as a coalition of over 30 parties, uniting liberal, conservative and Christian-democratic forces. Marian Krzaklewski was its first chairman. In 1997 the coalition was joined by RS AWS, and by the Freedom Union. Jerzy Buzek of RS AWS became Prime Minister of Poland.

The International Republican Institute, a US federal government-funded organisation loosely associated with the United States Republican Party, claims credit for having played a major role in uniting the different political parties which came together to create the AWS. It claims to have provided training in political campaigning, communications training and research which helped organise and create the AWS. It also states that once the AWS was in government, it organised an advertising campaign for the Polish government in order to stop the AWS splitting up over internal tensions:

IRI initiated a post-election program that emphasized media and communications training for Prime Minister Jerzy Buzek's chancellory and cabinet.

Reforms relating to domestic affairs, the entry to NATO in 1999 and the accession process to the European Union led to conflicts within the coalition, with many members moving to the more liberal Civic Platform, the right-wing Law and Justice party, or the Movement for Reconstruction of Poland. By 2001, the number of parties in the alliance was reduced to three including RS AWS. AWS formed a minority government under Jerzy Buzek, and the coalition was renamed AWSP (Akcja Wyborcza Solidarność Prawicy – "Solidarity of the Right" Electoral Action), while RS AWS became simply RS. In the 2001 elections, AWSP (including RS) did not obtain enough votes to enter Parliament and became defunct.

AWSP former leader Jerzy Buzek is now a member of the Civic Platform.

Election results

Sejm

Senate

Presidential

Regional assemblies

References

1996 establishments in Poland
2001 disestablishments in Poland
Christian democratic parties in Europe
Conservative parties in Poland
Defunct Christian political parties
Defunct conservative parties
Defunct political party alliances in Poland
International Republican Institute
Political parties disestablished in 2001
Political parties established in 1996
Solidarity (Polish trade union)